Maltus may refer to:

People:
Jonathan Maltus, winemaker of Château Teyssier, The Colonial Estate and their labels
Thomas Robert Malthus, a British scholar

In fiction:
Maltus (comics), a planet in the fictional universe of DC Comics